Unione Sportiva Castrovillari Calcio is an Italian association football club located in Castrovillari, Calabria.

It currently plays in Serie D.

History 
The club was founded in 1921.

In 2003, the side moved to Cosenza and changed its name to A.S. Cosenza F.C., taking the place of a local club, Cosenza Calcio 1914 S.p.A., that was facing financial problem.

The club was refounded in this summer by a new company.

Colors and badge 
Its colors are red and black.

References

External links
 Official site
 Castrovillari OnLine

Football clubs in Calabria
Association football clubs established in 1921
Serie C clubs
1921 establishments in Italy
U.S. Castrovillari Calcio